The following are the unofficial national records in speed skating in Syria. Syria is not a member of the ISU.

Men

Women

References

National records in speed skating
Speed skating-related lists
Syria
Speed skating
Speed skating